Descent into Chaos may refer to:
 Descent into Chaos (Nightrage album), 2005
 Descent into Chaos (Legion of the Damned album), 2011
 Descent into Chaos: The United States and the Failure of Nation Building... Book by Ahmed Rashid 2008, 
 Descent into Chaos: The doomed expedition to Low's Gully...  book by Richard Connaughton 1996,